No Regrets is a Hong Kong television drama that premiered on 18 October 2010 on the TVB Jade channel. Produced by Lee Tim-shing, the drama is a TVB production. The drama is set from the late 1930s Republic of China to the early 1940s Second Sino-Japanese War, centering on the conflicts between an influential triad family, who manages a successful opium production business in Guangzhou, and the city's police force. The two protagonists, drug lord Miss Kau (Sheren Tang) and criminal investigation team captain Lau Sing (Wayne Lai), begin to share a complicated relationship after experiencing various political and emotional setbacks.

List of episodes

See also
No Regrets (TV series)
List of No Regrets characters
Just-noregrets.blogspot.com "No Regrets" episodic synopsis

References

Lists of Chinese drama television series episodes